Gnädinger may refer to:
 Mathias Gnädinger (1941–2015), Swiss actor
 Gnadinger Park in Louisville, Kentucky